Dufouriellini is a tribe of minute pirate bugs in the family Lyctocoridae. There are about 7 genera and 15 described species in Dufouriellini.

Genera
These seven genera belong to the tribe Dufouriellini:
 Alofa Herring, 1976 i c g
 Amphiareus Distant, 1904 i c g b
 Brachysteles Mulsant & Rey, 1852 i c g b
 Buchananiella Reuter, 1884 i c g b
 Cardiastethus Fieber, 1860 i c g b
 Dufouriellus Kirkaldy, 1906 i c g b
 Physopleurella Reuter, 1884 i c g b
Data sources: i = ITIS, c = Catalogue of Life, g = GBIF, b = Bugguide.net

References

Further reading

External links

 
Lyctocoridae
Hemiptera tribes
Articles created by Qbugbot